A Jolly Christmas from Frank Sinatra is a Christmas album by American singer Frank Sinatra, originally released by Capitol Records in 1957.

This was Sinatra's first full-length Christmas album. It features the Ralph Brewster Singers along with an orchestra conducted by Gordon Jenkins.  Side One features secular holiday tunes, while Side Two has religious Christmas carols.

Capitol reissued the album in 1965 with different cover art and a new title, The Sinatra Christmas Album, both of which also featured on the album's initial 1987 compact disc pressing.  The original title and cover were eventually restored for subsequent CD pressings in 1990 and 1999. In 2001, the album art was altered from its 1957 version.  The CD bonus tracks were originally issued on a 1954 Capitol 45 rpm single, arranged and conducted by Nelson Riddle.

In 2007 the album was reissued yet again, with a "50th Anniversary" banner placed atop the 2001 cover art and an additional bonus track (a vintage radio PSA that Sinatra did for the American Lung Association's "Christmas Seals" campaign) added.

In 2010, the album was reissued on vinyl for the first time since the Mobile Fidelity Sound Lab reissue, #1-135, c. 1986 (separate from the 1983 16-LP box), exclusively to independent record stores.

Track listing

Personnel
 Frank Sinatra – lead vocals
 The Ralph Brewster Singers – background vocals
 Gordon Jenkins – arranger, conductor
 Nelson Riddle – arranger, conductor (CD bonus tracks)
Tracks 1, 5, 6, 7:

Frank Sinatra with The Ralph Brewster Singers and Orchestra conducted by Gordon Jenkins

Harry Bluestone, Joseph Livoti, Joseph Quadri, Lou Raderman, Marshall Sosson, Mischa Russell, Nicholas Pisani, Sol Kindler, Victor Amo, Walter Edelstein (vln); David Sterkin, Louis Kievman, Paul Robyn, William Baffa (via); Cy Bernard, Armand Kaproff (vie); Kathryn Thompson Vail (harp); Bill Miller (p); Allan Reuss (g); Jack Ryan, Nathaniel Gangursky (b); Nick Fatool (d); The Ralph Brewster Singers: Ralph Brewster, Barbara Ford, Betty Allan, Betty Noyes, Betty Wand, Beverly Jenkins, Bill Lee, Bill Thompson, Bob Wacker, Dorothy McCarty, Gene Lanham, Ginny Rees, Gloria Wood, Jimmy Joyce, John Mann, Lee Gotch, Loulie Jeanne Norman, Max Smith, Norma Zimmer, Peggy Clark, Ray Linn Jr., Robert Stevens, Sue Allen, Thora Mathiason, Thur Ravenscroft

16-July-1957 (Tuesday) - Hollywood. Capitol recording session no. E-33 - Capitol Tower (from 9 P.M. to 12 M.).
 

Tracks 2, 3, 4, 12

Frank Sinatra with The Ralph Brewster Singers and Orchestra conducted by Gordon Jenkins

David Frisina, Joseph Livoti, Joseph Quadri, Lou Raderman, Marshall Sosson, Mischa Russell, Nicholas Pisani, Sol Kindler, Victor Amo, Walter Edelstein (vln); David Sterkin, Louis Kievman, Paul Robyn, William Baffa (via); Cy Bernard, Armand Kaproff (vlc); Kathryn Thompson Vail (harp); Bill Miller (p); Allan Reuss (g); Jack Ryan, Nathaniel Gangursky (b); Ralph Hansell (d); The Ralph Brewster Singers: Ralph Brewster, Barbara Ford, Betty Allan, Betty Noyes, Betty Wand, Beverly Jenkins, Bill Lee, Bill Thompson, Bob Wacker, Dorothy McCarty, Gene Lanham, Ginny Rees, Gloria Wood, Jimmy Joyce, John Mann, Lee Gotch, Loulie Jeanne Norman, Max Smith, Norma Zimmer, Peggy Clark, Ray Linn Jr., Robert Stevens, Sue Allen, Thora Mathiason, Thurl Ravenscroft
17-July-1957 (Wednesday)- Hollywood. Capitol recording session no. E-34 - Capitol Tower.
  

Tracks 8, 9, 10, 11

Frank Sinatra with The Ralph Brewster Singers and Orchestra conducted by Gordon Jenkins

David Frisina, Harry Bluestone, Joseph Livoti, Joseph Quadri, Lou Raderman, Mischa Russell, Nicholas Pisani, Sol Kindler, Victor Arno, Walter Edelstein (vln); David Sterkin, Louis Kievman, Paul Robyn, William Baffa (via); Cy Bernard, Armand Kaproff (vie); Kathryn Thompson Vail (harp); Bill Miller (p); Allan Reuss (g); Jack Ryan, Nathaniel Gangursky (b); Nick Fatool (d); The Ralph Brewster Singers: Ralph Brewster, Barbara Ford, Betty Noyes, Gloria Wood, Loulie Jeanne Norman, Nonna Zimmer, Sue Allen, Thora Mathiason

Betty Allan, Betty Wand, Beverly Jenkins, Bill Lee, Bill Thompson, Bob Wacker, Dorothy McCarty, Gene Lanham, Ginny Rees, Jimmy Joyce, John Mann, Lee Gotch, Max Smith, Peggy Clark, Ray Linn Jr., Robert Stevens, Thurl Ravenscroft

10-July-1957 (Wednesday)- Hollywood. Capitol recording session no. E-32 - Capitol Tower (from 9 P.M. to 12 M.).
 

Tracks 13, 14

Frank Sinatra with Orchestra conducted by Nelson Riddle

Si Zentner (tbn); George Roberts (b-tbn); Vincent DeRosa, John Cave (fr-h); James Williamson, Dominic Mumolo, Champ Webb, John Hacker (sax/wwd); Alex Beller, Felix Slatkin, Harry Bluestone, Henry Hill, Mischa Russell, Paul Shure, Victor Bay, Walter Edelstein (vln); David Sterkin, Stanley Harris (via); Cy Bernard, Eleanor Slatkin, Edgar Lustgarten (vlc); Kathryn Julye (harp); Bill Miller (p); Allan Reuss (g); Joe Comfort (b); Lou Singer, Alvin Stoller (d/perc ); Allan Davies, Betty Noyes, Betty Wand, Burton Dole, Charles Schrouder, Clark Yocum, Dorothy McCarty, Gil Mershon, Ginny Rees, Lee Gotch, Mack McLean, Marie Vernon, Norma Zimmer, Ray Linn Jr. (vocal on all sides). 

23-August-1954 (Monday) - Hollywood. Capitol recording session no. 3507 - KHJ Studios (from 8 P.M. to 12 M.).

Charts

Certifications

References

1957 Christmas albums
Frank Sinatra albums
Christmas albums by American artists
Albums arranged by Gordon Jenkins
Capitol Records Christmas albums
Covers albums
Albums conducted by Gordon Jenkins
Albums arranged by Nelson Riddle
Albums conducted by Nelson Riddle
Albums recorded at Capitol Studios
Pop Christmas albums
Jazz Christmas albums